Antoni Woryna (born 15 February 1941 in Rybnik, Poland - died 14 December 2002) was an international motorcycle speedway rider who appeared in the Speedway World Championship finals five times, and was the first Polish rider to win a medal at that level when he won the bronze medal in 1966. He was a member of the Polish World Team Cup winning teams of 1965 and 1966.

World Final Appearances

Individual World Championship
 1965 -  London, Wembley Stadium -  10th - 6pts
 1966 -  Göteborg, Ullevi - 3rd - 13pts
 1967 -  London, Wembley Stadium -  11th - 5pts
 1968 -  Göteborg, Ullevi - 12th - 5pts
 1970 -  Wroclaw, Olympic Stadium -  3rd - 13pts

World Team Cup
 1965 -  Kempten (with Andrzej Wyglenda / Zbigniew Podlecki / Andrzej Pogorzelski) - Winner - 38pts (9)
 1966 -  Wrocław, Olympic Stadium (with Andrzej Wyglenda / Andrzej Pogorzelski / Marian Rose / Edmund Migoś) - Winner - 41pts (11)
 1967 -  Malmö, Malmö Stadion (with Jerzy Trzeszkowski / Andrzej Pogorzelski / Andrzej Wyglenda / Zbigniew Podlecki) - 2nd - 26pts (10)
 1970 -  London, Wembley Stadium (with Jan Mucha / Paweł Waloszek / Edmund Migoś / Henryk Glücklich) - 3rd - 20pts (5)
 1971 -  Wroclaw, Olympic Stadium (with Paweł Waloszek / Henryk Glücklich /  Edward Jancarz / Andrzej Wyglenda) - 3rd - 19pts (4)

References

External links
Antoni Woryna - Portrait(Polish)

1941 births
2002 deaths
Polish speedway riders
People from Rybnik
Sportspeople from Silesian Voivodeship
Poole Pirates riders